The 2018–19 Wright State Raiders men's basketball team represented Wright State University during the 2018–19 NCAA Division I men's basketball season. The Raiders, led by third-year head coach Scott Nagy, played their home games at the Nutter Center in Fairborn, Ohio, as members of the Horizon League. They finished the season 21–14, 13–5 in Horizon League to be regular season co-champions with Northern Kentucky. They defeated IUPUI and Green Bay to advance to the championship game of the Horizon League tournament where they lost to Northern Kentucky. As regular season league champion, and number 1 seed in their league tournament, who failed to win their league tournament, they received an automatic bid to the National Invitation Tournament where they lost in the first round to Clemson.

Previous season
The Raiders finished the 2017–18 season 25–10, 14–4 in Horizon League play to finish in second place. In the Horizon League tournament, they defeated Green Bay, Milwaukee, and Cleveland State to become Horizon League Tournament champions. This received the Horizon League's automatic bid to the NCAA tournament, where they lost to Tennessee in the first round.

Roster

Schedule and results

|-
! colspan="9" style=| Exhibition

|-
! colspan="9" style=| Non-conference regular season

|-
! colspan="9" style=| Horizon League regular season

|-
! colspan="9" style=|Horizon League tournament
|-

|-
! colspan="9" style=|NIT
|-

References

Wright State Raiders men's basketball seasons
Wright State
Wright State Raiders men's b
Wright State Raiders men's b
Wright State